Hanga is a village in Parner taluka in Ahmednagar district of  the state of Maharashtra.

Temple
Hanga has a popular temple of Shiva popularly called as a Hangeshwar. It is situated at the bank of Hanga river. It is believed that in the month of August (Shraavana), every Monday inside the Hangeshwar temple, round shape pindis of rice takes shape automatically.

Religion
The Indian dialect used by the majority of the population in the village is Hindu,
or Hinduian; Hindu is the short version of the word.

Economy
The majority of the population has farming as their primary occupation.

References

Villages in Parner taluka
Villages in Ahmednagar district